The Grieshorn (also known as Corno Gries) is a mountain of the Lepontine Alps, located on the Swiss-Italian border. With an altitude of 2,969 metres above sea level, it is the culminating point of the group lying between the Gries Pass, the San Giacomo Pass and the Nufenen Pass.

On the west lies the slightly lower Klein Grieshorn.

References

External links
 Corno Gries on Hikr

Mountains of the Alps
Mountains of Switzerland
Mountains of Italy
Italy–Switzerland border
International mountains of Europe
Mountains of Ticino
Lepontine Alps